Come 2 Me is Raymond Lam's fourth album, released on July 17, 2010.

Track listing

CD
Hello
Come 2 Me
Rain Drops (Music Only)
我們很好 (We Are Fine)
Morning Cute
Flashback (Music Only)
定鏡 (Fixed Mirror)
Vampire
Out Of Reach (Music Only)
所謂理想 (The So-Called Ideal)
一直都在 (Always Here) with Charlene Choi
Slow Motion (Music Only)
直到你不找我 (Until You Stop Searching For Me)
同謀 (Accomplice)
The Beginning Is The End (Music Only)

References

2010 albums
Raymond Lam albums